In mathematics, an N-topological space is a set equipped with N arbitrary topologies. If τ1, τ2, ..., τN are N topologies defined on a nonempty set X, then the N-topological space is denoted by (X,τ1,τ2,...,τN).
For N = 1, the structure is simply a topological space.
For N = 2, the structure becomes a bitopological space introduced by J. C. Kelly.

Example 
Let X = {x1, x2, ...., xn} be any finite set. Suppose Ar = {x1, x2, ..., xr}. Then the collection τ1 = {φ, A1, A2, ..., An = X} will be a topology on X. If τ1, τ2, ..., τm be m such topologies (chain topologies) defined on X, then the structure (X, τ1, τ2, ..., τm) is an ''m''-topological space.

References 

Mathematical terminology
Topology